The United Nations War Crimes Commission (UNWCC) initially called the United Nations Commission for the Investigation of War Crimes, was a commission of the United Nations that investigated allegations of war crimes committed by Nazi Germany and the other Axis powers in World War II.

History

The Commission was constituted at the behest of the British government and the other sixteen Allied nations at a meeting held at the British Foreign Office in London on 20th October, 1943, prior to the formal establishment of the United Nations in 1945. 

The proposal of its establishment was made by the Lord Chancellor John Simon in the House of Lords on 7 October, 1942. A similar statement was issued by the United States government.The Commission's objects and powers were conferred as follows: It should investigate and record the evidence of war crimes, identifying where possible the individuals responsible.
 It should report to the Governments concerned cases in which it appeared that adequate evidence might be expected to be forthcoming.

One of the Commission's tasks was to carefully collect evidence of war crimes for the arrest and fair trial of alleged Axis war criminals. However, the Commission had no power to prosecute criminals by itself. It merely reported back to the government members of the UN. These governments then could convene tribunals, such as the Nuremberg International Military Tribunal and the International Military Tribunal for the Far East. The Commission was headed by Cecil Hurst from 1943 to 1945, then by Lord Wright until 1948 before being dissolved in 1949.

According to British academic Dan Plesch, Adolf Hitler was put on the UNWCC's first list of war criminals in December 1944, after determining that Hitler could be held criminally responsible for the acts of the Nazis in occupied countries. By March 1945, a month before Hitler's death, "the commission had endorsed at least seven separate indictments against him for war crimes."

However limited its powers, the creation of the commission was a landmark in the history of human justice in the field of international law.

Vahagn Avedian states that the designation of the subsequent report as "restricted" might explain why it is relatively unknown in the literature and has been overlooked in many relevant discussions about e.g. Crimes Against Humanity, the UN Genocide Convention and their applicability on historical cases. One such highly debated case is the Armenian Genocide, both within the scholarly and the political communities, but also in regard to the conducted UN Genocide studies (the 1973 Ruhashyankiko Report and the 1985 Whitaker Report). The UNWCC report dedicated an entire chapter to the historical background of the term Crimes Against Humanity, a new indictment beside the two existing Crimes Against Peace and War Crime. The seven page historical background used mainly the Armenian massacres during WWI and the findings of the 1919 Commission of Responsibilities to substantiate the usage of the term Crimes Against Humanity as a precedent for the Nuremberg Charter's Article 6, in turn being the basis for the impending review of the UN Genocide Convention. Considering the controversies surrounding both the  Ruhashyankiko Report and the  Whitaker Report, in which the Armenian case played a pivotal role, Avedian notes that the UNWCC Report were seemingly unknown to the entire Sub-Commission on Prevention of Discrimination and Protection of Minorities, including Nicodème Ruhashyankiko and Ben Whitaker (politician) and could have been a highly significant resource in justifying respective Rapporteur's arguments.

See also 

 Punishment for War Crimes

References

Citations

Sources

External links

 Records of the United Nations War Crimes Commission (UNWCC) (1943-1949) at the United Nations Archives

World War II crimes
History of the United Nations